A gravedigger is a cemetery worker who is responsible for digging a grave prior to a funeral service.

Gravedigger, or variants, may also refer to:

Arts and entertainment

Fictional characters
 The Gravediggers, in William Shakespeare's Hamlet
 Gravedigger Jones, in the Harlem Detective novels by Chester Himes
 Grave Digger, in the Gold Digger series of comics
 Gravedigger (comics), several characters in DC comics 
 The Grave Digger, in Bones

Music
 Grave Digger (band), a German heavy metal band
 The Grave Digger, a 2001 album
 The Grave Diggers, an American rockabilly band
 Gravediggaz, an American hip hop group
 "Gravedigger" (song), by Dave Matthews, 2003, also performed by Willie Nelson
 "Gravedigger", a song by Architects from the 2014 album Lost Forever // Lost Together
 "The Gravedigger's Song", by Mark Lanegan, 2012

Other uses in arts and entertainment
 "The Gravediggers" (The Avengers), an episode of the 1960s TV series
 "The Grave Digger", a 1952 Arabic poem by Badr Shakir al-Sayyab
 Gravedigger, a 1982 book by Joseph Hansen

Other uses
 Grave Digger (monster truck), a monster truck racing team
 The Gravedigger, a professional wrestler from the United States Wrestling Association

See also
 
 
 
 Grobari (Serbian for 'gravediggers'), fans of FK Partizan Belgrade